Down Sewer is a  long river in the Wealden District of East Sussex, England, that is a tributary to Hurst Haven. Located in the Pevensey Levels, it rises from White Dyke Sewer and flows a southeasterly course.

References 

Rivers of East Sussex
Rivers of the Pevensey Levels